Braas may refer to:
 Braås, a locality situated in Växjö Municipality, Kronoberg County, Sweden
 Lothar Alfred Braas (author abbreviation: Braas, 1942-1995), a German botanist
 Roel Braas (born 1987), a Dutch rower